The 1933 Campeonato Nacional de Fútbol Profesional was the inaugural season the top tier of Chilean football. The season began on 22 July and ended on 5 November 1933.

The winner of this first-ever season, was Magallanes.

Scores

Standings

Championship play-off
Due to the draw in the table's first place, it was decided that Magallanes and Colo-Colo play a tie-breaker match.

Both teams, before the game, developed its concentrations in towns near to Santiago. Magallanes players did it in Peñaflor, whilst the team of Colo-Colo did it in Apoquindo.

Topscorer

References

External links
Chile 1933
ANFP 

Primera División de Chile seasons
Chile
Prim